Timo Heinze (born 23 February 1986 in Rosenheim, Bavaria) is a German retired footballer who last played for Fortuna Köln.

Career
Heinze began his career with SC Westerndorf before joining  TSV 1860 Rosenheim. In 1998, after six years with TSV 1860 Rosenheim he signed a youth contract with FC Bayern Munich and was promoted to the reserve team in 2004. In 2009, Heinze left FC Bayern Munich the club and signed for local rivals SpVgg Unterhaching on a three-year contract. He left the club after one year. After a year without a club, he signed for Fortuna Köln in 2011. He retired after the season.

International career
Heinze is former Germany national youth football team member and played 23 games.

Personal life
Heinze was born in Rosenheim, Bavaria. Heinze wrote a book called "Injury time. An unfinished football career."

Career statistics

References

External links

Kicker Profile

1986 births
FC Bayern Munich II players
SpVgg Unterhaching players
SC Fortuna Köln players
German footballers
Germany youth international footballers
Living people
Association football defenders
3. Liga players
Regionalliga players
People from Rosenheim
Sportspeople from Upper Bavaria
Footballers from Bavaria